Eunice Marya Rosen (born September 6, 1930) is an American bridge player. She is married to fellow bridge champion William Rosen.

In 1958 and in 1966, Eunice and Bill won the Master Mixed Teams, now known as the Chicago Mixed Board-a-Match tournament. In 2000, she won the Whitehead Women's Pairs playing with Joan Stein. Her impressive defensive bridge skills became widely regarded in the bridge community, resulting in a write-up in The New York Times column covering one of her remarkable moves.

In a 1982 New York Times column, Alan Truscott called Eunice Rosen "one of the leading players in the game."

Her parents were Samuel and Marion Berg. Eunice and William live in Highland Park, Illinois. They have four children: Marc Jeremy Rosen, Marta Jane Freud, James David Rosen and Gary Andrew Rosen.

Wins
 North American Bridge Championships (3)
 Master Mixed Teams (2) 1958, 1966
 Women's Pairs (1) 2000

Runner-up
 North American Bridge Championships (1)
 Women's Board-a-Match Teams (1) 1972

References

1930 births
American contract bridge players
Living people
Place of birth missing (living people)
People from Highland Park, Illinois